The Formula Chrysler Euroseries was a single-make open-wheel racing series based in Europe. It ran only in 2001.

History
Launched as the International Single Seater Challenge the series had to fill the gap between national Formula Three championship and the Formula 3000 series. The car was first tested by Guy Smith in November 2000 at Donington Park. The initial season started with a promotional event at Circuit Park Zandvoort. Eight drivers were present at the event. However, the race was stopped early as there were only two cars running after eight laps. Anthony Kumpen won the race, he finished in front of Aldo Piedade, Jr.. The official season started on August 25 at the Österreichring in Austria. Six drivers started the first race with Charles Hall winning. The biggest grid was at the Nürburgring where ten cars made an appearance. Ricardo van der Ende dominated the season claiming four wins and six podium finishes out of seven races.

A calendar was announced for the 2002 season. The season would consist of thirteen races at ten different European circuits. According to the official website the season opener was pushed back by three months because of the bankruptcy of car supplier Reynard Motorsport. The number of rounds was also reduced to five double headers.

Revival
The Reynard chassis were bought by Dutch entrepreneur Harry Maessen in 2006. The idea was to increase performance and form a racing series in 2008. In 2008 the renewed cars, renamed Formula BRL ran a test session at Circuit Zolder. Various Dutch drivers tested the car fitted with a 420hp Ford V8 engine. Later in the season the cars ran two demonstration races at the TT Circuit Assen. Former champion Ricardo van der Ende participated in the event. The races were won by Henk Vuik, Jr. and Nelson van der Pol. At the end of the 2008 season the idea for a racing series was scrapped.

Scoring system
 Below is the scoring system used for the series during its 2001 season:

Champions

See also
 Auto GP
International Formula Master

External links
driverdb.com Formula Chrysler Euroseries 2001
speedsport-magazine.com Formula Chrysler Euroseries
motorsport-archive.com Formula Chrysler Euroseries

References

 
Defunct auto racing series
Formula racing series
Formula racing
European auto racing series
One-make series